Potassium trispyrazolylborate, commonly abbreviated KTp, is the potassium salt of the trispyrazolylborate ligand.

KTp is a white crystalline solid which is soluble in polar solvents, alcohols, and water. The synthesis of KTp involves potassium borohydride and pyrazole without a solvent.
KBH4 + 3 pzH → KTp + 3 H2

The tris(pyrazolyl)borate forms octahedral coordination compounds with the formula M[Tp]2 with first row transition metals. KTp also forms 1:1 complexes, for example it can be converted to K[TpMo(CO)3];
KTp+Mo(CO)6→K[TpMo(CO)3 ]+ 3CO

When K[TpMo(CO)3] is treated with butyl nitrite it yields the neutral orange complex TpMo(CO)2NO.
K[TpMo(CO)3]+ BuONO→TpMo(CO)2NO+CO+KOBu

References

Potassium compounds
Boron compounds
Pyrazoles